Gaozi South railway station(Chinese: 高资南站) is a railway station of Shanghai-Nanjing Intercity Railway located in Jiangsu, People's Republic of China.

Railway stations in Jiangsu